OTO Award TV Series

Currently held by  Horná Dolná – Markíza

First awarded  | Last awarded 2008 | Present 

OTO Award for TV Series has been bestowed to the most recognized television series of the past year in Slovakia since 2008. In the year 2009, the accolade was given in two acting categories, depending on a genre such as TV drama and TV comedy. Since 2010, the general category is held.

Winners and nominees

2000s

2010s

Superlatives

Associated categories
OTO Award TV Series – Drama

First awarded  | Last awarded 2009

TV Series – Drama

TV Series – Comedy

OTO Award TV Series – Comedy

First awarded  | Last awarded 2009

References

External links
 OTO Awards (Official website)
 OTO Awards - Winners and nominees (From 2000 onwards)
 OTO Awards - Winners and nominees (From 2000 to 2009)

OTO Awards
Slovak culture
Slovak television awards
Awards established in 2000